Kunihisa (written 邦久 or 国久) is a masculine Japanese given name. Notable people with the name include:

, Japanese daimyō
, Japanese Go player
, Japanese anime director

Japanese masculine given names